(born March 7, 1969) is a former Japanese nordic combined skier who competed during the 1990s, winning at the FIS Nordic World Ski Championships, the Winter Olympics, and the Holmenkollen ski festival.

Kono won three medals at the Winter Olympics, including two golds (3 x 10 km team: 1992, 1994) and a silver (15 km individual: 1994). He also won two gold medals in the team event at the world championships (3 x 10 km: 1993, 4 x 5 km: 1995).

Kono also won the Nordic combined event at the Holmenkollen ski festival in 1993, becoming the first Asian to win at the prestigious event.

Kono was Deputy Vice Mayor of the Athletes Village at the 1998 Winter Olympics.

He is now coach for the Japanese Nordic combined team, a role he has had since 2006.

References

External links
 
 Holmenkollen winners since 1892 - click Vinnere for downloadable pdf file 
 

1969 births
Nordic combined skiers at the 1992 Winter Olympics
Nordic combined skiers at the 1994 Winter Olympics
Holmenkollen Ski Festival winners
Japanese male Nordic combined skiers
Living people
Olympic Nordic combined skiers of Japan
Olympic gold medalists for Japan
Olympic silver medalists for Japan
Olympic medalists in Nordic combined
FIS Nordic World Ski Championships medalists in Nordic combined
Medalists at the 1994 Winter Olympics
Medalists at the 1992 Winter Olympics
Universiade medalists in nordic combined
Universiade silver medalists for Japan
Competitors at the 1989 Winter Universiade
Competitors at the 1991 Winter Universiade